The Hollis Street Theatre (1885–1935) was a theatre in Boston, Massachusetts, that presented dramatic plays, opera, musical concerts, and other entertainments.

Brief history

Boston architect John R. Hall designed the 1,600-seat theatre in 1885, on the site of the former Hollis Street Church.  The interior was designed by Zachariah Mode, who also designed the interior of the Colonial Theater in Boston.

On opening night,

The new theatre was crowded to-night by an audience which came from among the best people in Boston. The street was crowded with people in the afternoon, and it was almost impossible to get near the doors at the time they were opened. People holding tickets met with great difficulty in getting in, so that the audience was not entirely seated until some time after the curtain should have risen. As soon as they did get in, however, they found a roomy, gorgeous interior fitted up with every attention to comfort and decorated brightly in gold, blue, and white. Most of the tickets had been sold in advance by auction, and it has been impossible for several days to secure places for the opening performance. ... The Mikado ... made an immense hit to-night.

The many shows presented at the theatre featured a number of notables, including Maurice Barrymore, Sarah Bernhardt, William Gillette, Henry Irving, Doris Keane, Julia Marlowe and Ellen Terry. Others associated with the theatre included Isaac B. Rich; Edward E. Rice; Charles Frohmann.

The building was demolished in 1935.

Selected shows
 1885 - The Mikado by Gilbert and Sullivan; with D'Oyly Carte, John Stetson's company, Arthur Wilkinson, S. Cadwallader, John Howson, Signor Brocolini, Laura Clement, Hattie Delaro, Rosa Cooke.
 1886 - Nanon by F. Zell and Richard Genée; with Carleton Opera Co.
 1887 
 Daniela by Felix Phillippi; with Helena Modjeska
 Twelfth Night by Shakespeare; with Helen Modjeska
 Fedora by Victorien Sardou, with Sarah Bernhardt
 1888
 Uncle Tom's Cabin
 Cuisla-M-Chree by Dion Boucicault
 1892
 Richelieu by Edward Bulwer Lytton; with Daniel Goddard Crandon
 Hess and Hoss
 Men and Women 
 1896 - A Good Thing, with Peter F. Daily (approximate date)
 1897 - The Devil's Disciple, Richard Mansfield, December 27, 1897
 1901 - Sherlock Holmes
 1903
 Skipper & Co., Wall St. by H.J.W. Dam; with Maclyn Arbuckle
 Markheim, with E. H. Sothern
 1907 - The Great Galeoto by Jose Echegaray
 1908 - The Boy and the Girl by Richard Carle and H.L Heartz
 1909
 Lady Frederick
 Love Watches
 1910 
 What Every Woman Knows by J. M. Barrie, with Maude Adams
 The Sham, with Henrietta Crosman
 The Traveling Salesman
 Mrs. Dot by Somerset Maugham; with Billie Burke
 The Prince Duma by Henry Blossom and Victor Herbert; with Fritzi Scheff
 The Pillars of Society by Henrik Ibsen; with Mrs. Fiske
 Mid-Channel by Arthur Wing Pinero, with Ethel Barrymore
 The Prosecutor by Franklin Searight; with Emmett Corrigan
 Russian Balalaika Orchestra
 1912
 The Attack
 1912
 Rebecca of Sunnybrook Farm by Kate Douglas Wiggin and Charlotte Thompson
 1913
 The Mind the Paint Girl by Arthur Wing Pinero; with Billie Burke
 Kismet; with Otis Skinner
 1915 
 Grumpy
 Sherlock Holmes written by and starring William Gillette with Edward Fielding as Watson
 1916 - Daddy Long Legs
 1917 - Come out of the Kitchen by A.E. Thomas
 1919 - Dear Brutus by J. M. Barrie
1920 - The Czarina featuring Doris Keane by Melchior Lengyel and Lajos Bíró and adapted by Edward Sheldon
 1924 - The Nervous Wreck by Owen Davis
 1928 - The American Opera Company (Mar 12 through Mar 24)

References

External links

 Library of Congress. Historic American Buildings Survey. Hollis Street Theater, Hollis Street, Boston.

Former theatres in Boston
Event venues established in 1885
Demolished buildings and structures in Boston
19th century in Boston
Boston Theater District
Buildings and structures demolished in 1935